The 1969 Purdue Boilermakers football team represented Purdue University during the 1969 Big Ten Conference football season. Led by Jack Mollenkopf in his 14th and final season as head coach, the Boilermakers compiled an overall record of 8–2 with a mark of 5–2 in conference play, placing third in the Big Ten. Purdue played home games at Ross–Ade Stadium in West Lafayette, Indiana.

Schedule

Roster

Game summaries

TCU
Randy Cooper 23 rushes, 117 yards

Stanford
 Mike Phipps 28/39 passing, 429 yards

Awards

All-Big Ten: HB Stan Brown (2nd), T Paul DeNuccio (1st), DB Tim Foley (2nd), DE Bill McKoy (2nd), LB Veno Paraskevas (1st), QB Mike Phipps (1st), C Walter Whitehead (2nd), T Bill Yancher (1st)

Chicago Tribune Big Ten MVP: QB Mike Phipps

References

Purdue
Purdue Boilermakers football seasons
Purdue Boilermakers football